Breaking the Ethers is the debut album from collaborative group Tuatara.  Released on Epic Records, it was an attempt by members of Luna, the Screaming Trees and R.E.M. to try their hand at experimental, multi-ethnic music. It was produced by Barrett Martin and Justin Harwood.

Track listing and Personnel
 "Breaking the Ethers/Serengeti" - (Justin Harwood, Barrett Martin, Skerik) - 6:25
 Skerik - saxophone, didgeridoo, steel drums, temple gong, bombard, percussion
 Justin Harwood - double bass
 Barrett Martin - drums, percussion, marimba, tabla, congas, Tibetan horns, bullroarer, Taos thunder drum, steel drums, acoustic guitar
 Elliot Haas - bullroarer
 "Dark State of Mind" - (Harwood, Martin, Skerik) - 4:02
 Skerik - saxophone
 Justin Harwood - acoustic guitar, bowed bass, double bass
 Barrett Martin - drums, percussion, vibraphone, marimba, cello
 "Saturday Night Church" - (Harwood, Martin) - 4:26
 Skerik - saxophone
 Steve Berlin - bass penny whistle
 Justin Harwood - acoustic guitar, piano, double bass
 Peter Buck - electric six string bass
 Barrett Martin - drums, percussion, vibraphone
 "Dreamscape" - (Harwood, Martin) - 4:04
 Justin Harwood - bowed bass
 Peter Buck - electric six string bass
 Barrett Martin - drums, marimba, bass marimba, steel drums
 Skerik - vibraphone
 "The Desert Sky" - (Peter Buck, Harwood, Martin, Skerik) - 5:35
 Peter Buck - dulcimer
 Justin Harwood - steel drums
 Skerik - udu
 Barrett Martin - percussion, taos thunder drum, tabla, bass marimba, sitar
 "Goodnight la Habana" - (Harwood, Martin) - 4:49
 Skerik - saxophone
 Justin Harwood - Spanish guitar, double bass, percussion
 Barrett Martin - drums, percussion, congas, timbales, marimba, piano
 "Smoke Rings" - (Harwood, Martin) - 3:24
 Skerik - saxophone
 Justin Harwood - slide guitar, vibraphone
 Barrett Martin - marimba, bass marimba, steel drums
 "The Getaway" - (Harwood, Martin) - 5:04
 Skerik - saxophone
 Peter Buck - electric guitar
 Mike McCready - electric guitar
 Justin Harwood - double bass
 Barrett Martin - drums, percussion, congas
 "Eastern Star" - (Buck, Harwood, Martin) - 4:20
 Skerik - saxophone
 Peter Buck - dulcimer
 Justin Harwood - bowed bass
 Barrett Martin - percussion, udu, dumbeck, bass marimba
 Scott McCaughey - steel drums
 "Burning the Keys" - (Harwood, Martin, Skerik) - 6:34
 Skerik - saxophone, piano
 Peter Buck - electric six string bass
 Justin Harwood - double bass, vibraphone
 Barrett Martin - drums, congas, djembe, marimba, bass marimba
 "Land of Apples" - (Buck, Harwood, Martin, Skerik) - 5:38
 Skerik - harmonium
 Justin Harwood - bowed bass, double bass
 Peter Buck - slide guitar
 Barrett Martin - congas, tabla, djembe, vibraphone, marimba, bass marimba, piano
 "Breaking the Ethers/Serengeti (Reprise)" - (Harwood, Martin, Skerik) 1:42

References

1997 debut albums
Tuatara (band) albums
Epic Records albums